Trithemis aurora, the crimson marsh glider, is a species of dragonfly in the family Libellulidae. It is a common and widely distributed species found throughout the year across the Indian subcontinent and Southeast Asia.

Description
The male of the species is distinctly different from the female. The male has a reddish-brown face, with eyes that are crimson above and brown on the sides. The thorax is red with a fine, purple pruinescence. The abdomen, the base of which is swollen, is crimson with a violet tinge. The wings are transparent with crimson venation and the base has a broad amber patch. The wing spots are a dark reddish-brown and the legs are black.

The female has an olivaceous or bright reddish-brown face with eyes that are purplish-brown above and grey below. The thorax is olivaceous with brown median and black lateral stripes. The abdomen is reddish-brown with median and lateral black markings. The black markings are confluent at the end of each segment and enclose a reddish-brown spot. The wings are transparent with brown tips. The venation is bright yellow to brown and basal amber markings are pale. The wing spots are a dark brown and the lags are dark grey with narrow yellow stripes.

Habitat
It is commonly found in weedy tanks and ponds, marshes, channels, and slow flowing streams and rivers in the lowlands and mid-hills. It breeds in streams, rivers, canals, ponds and tanks.

Photo gallery

See also
 List of odonates of Sri Lanka
 List of odonates of India
 List of odonata of Kerala

References

External links

Trithemis
Insects of Asia
Insects described in 1839
Taxa named by Hermann Burmeister